St Nicholas Church is a Church of England church located in Gayton, Norfolk.

Overview
The construction of the church building was completed in 1604. The tower has a domed top with emblems of the evangelists on each of the four corners: the winged man for St Matthew, a lion for St Mark, an ox for St Luke, and an eagle for St John.

It was added to the Grade I listed buildings in King's Lynn and West Norfolk on 15 August 1960.

In September 2013, James Meade, the son of equestrian champion Richard Meade, and Lady Laura Marsham, daughter of Julian Charles Marsham, 8th Earl of Romney, who lives in nearby Gayton Hall, got married in this church. Prince William, Duke of Cambridge, Prince Harry and Pippa Middleton were in attendance at the wedding.

The church is open from nine in the morning to five in the afternoon every day.

Gallery

References

Gayton
Gayton
1604 establishments in England